Agiokampos (Greek: Αγιόκαμπος) may refer to several places in Greece:

Agiokampos, Euboea, a village in the Euboea prefecture
Agiokampos, Larissa, a village in the Larissa Prefecture